Minuscule 530 (in the Gregory-Aland numbering), ε 151 (in Soden's numbering), is a Greek minuscule manuscript of the New Testament, on a parchment. Palaeographically it has been assigned to the 11th century.
It has marginalia and was adapted for liturgical use.

Scrivener labeled it by number 485.

Description 

The codex contains a complete text of the four Gospels on 303 parchment leaves (size ) with some lacunae (Mark 14:69-15:10; John 20:10-23; 21:3-24). It has some foreign matter.

It is written in one column per page, 20 lines per page.

There is also a division according to the smaller Ammonian Sections (in Mark 247 Sections - the last section in 16:5), but with only a few references to the Eusebian Canons.

Text 

The Greek text of the codex is a representative of the Byzantine text-type. Hermann von Soden classified it to the textual family Kx. Aland placed it in Category V.

According to the Claremont Profile Method it represents the textual family Kx in Luke 1 and Luke 20; in Luke 10 no profile was made.

History 

The manuscript is dated by the INTF on the palaeographical ground to the 11th century.

The manuscript was examined by Burgon.

The manuscript was added to the list of New Testament minuscule manuscripts by F. H. A. Scrivener (485) and C. R. Gregory (530). Gregory saw it in 1883.

It is currently housed at the Bodleian Library (MS. Rawl. G. 3) in Oxford.

See also 

 List of New Testament minuscules
 Biblical manuscript
 Textual criticism

References

Further reading 

 

Greek New Testament minuscules
11th-century biblical manuscripts
Bodleian Library collection